Eric Akomanin Donkor (born 12 May 1992) is a Ghanaian professional footballer who plays as a defender who last played for Ghanaian Premier League side Ashanti Gold. He is known for playing for both rivals Asante Kotoko and Ashanti Gold. He won the Ghana Premier League three times and the Ghana FA Cup twice during his time at Asante Kotoko.

Career 
Donkor played for Winneba-based team Windy Professionals before moving to Kumasi-based Asante Kotoko in 2011. He won the league title with Asante Kotoko on three consecutive periods, 2011–12, 2012–13 and 2012–13 seasons. He played for Kotoko from 2011 to 2018. In 2018, he joined Obuasi-based team Ashanti Gold on a two-year contract. He featured for the club in the 2019–20 CAF Confederation Cup. He left AshGold in 2020 after the expiration of his contract.

References

External links 

 
 

Living people
1992 births
Association football defenders
Ghana Premier League players
Asante Kotoko S.C. players
Ashanti Gold SC players
Ghanaian footballers
Windy Professionals FC players